coulombs (symbol: C) usually refers to the plural of the SI unit for electric charge

Coulombs may also refer to:
 Coulombs, Calvados, a commune in Basse-Normandie, France
 Coulombs, Eure-et-Loir, a commune in central France
 Coulombs-en-Valois, a commune in the Seine-et-Marne département, France

See also
 Coulomb (disambiguation)